Quaker Street is a hamlet in the town of Duanesburg, Schenectady County, New York, United States. The zipcode is: 12141.

Notes

Hamlets in Schenectady County, New York
Hamlets in New York (state)